Bally Sports Arizona holds the regional cable television rights to three of the four major professional sports franchises in the Phoenix area: the Arizona Diamondbacks (Major League Baseball, with rights to most regular season games), the Phoenix Suns (NBA, with rights to most regular season and early-round playoff games) and the Arizona Coyotes (NHL, also with rights to most regular season and early-round playoff games), as well as the Phoenix Mercury (WNBA). Also, they carry games for the Arizona Rattlers of the Indoor Football League (which also stream live on YouTube). In addition, Bally Sports Arizona also televises collegiate sports events involving the Arizona State Sun Devils, as well as a number of events from other teams of the Pac-12 Conference.

Radio
 
 
In 2019-20, KGME regained its contract as the flagship station of the Arizona Coyotes. Previously, the Coyotes games were broadcast on KMVP.

Television

Strader was hired by the Phoenix Coyotes on July 2, 2007. He was reunited with his former ESPN and ABC partner, Darren Pang, for Coyotes broadcasts for two seasons. With no television contract in place for Coyotes games, Pang left in 2009 to join the St. Louis Blues. Strader was joined in the broadcast booth by former NHL player Tyson Nash. In July 2011, Strader left his position with the Coyotes to accept a full-time job with NBC/Versus. 

Matt McConnell is the current play by play announcer for the Arizona Coyotes.

References

External links
Louie DeBrusk's profile at the Coyotes' website
Coyotes Sign Broadcast Team to Multi-Year Contracts
Arizona Coyotes broadcasters renew contracts with multiyear deals
It’s Official: KGME Now Flagship Station Of Arizona Coyotes.
Coyotes sign 98.7 FM broadcast team to multi-year contracts

 
Lists of National Hockey League broadcasters
broadcasters
Fox Sports Networks
Bally Sports